John Lincoln Duffield (born 1939) is a British financier. He founded Jupiter Fund Management, one of the largest fund managers operating in London.

Career
The second son of physician and psychiatrist John Elwes Duffield (1910-2009) and his first wife, Jean Edwina (née Stellman), Duffield was educated at Harrow School and then took a degree in biochemistry at the University of Oxford. After this, he went into investment management and, having become manager of his wife's estates, moved to Switzerland as a tax exile.

He founded Jupiter Asset Management in 1985. After selling Jupiter Asset Management to Commerzbank, he founded New Star Asset Management in 2001.

Family
He was married to Vivien Clore but was divorced from her in 1976; they had one son and one daughter. Duffield owns the Marcham Farms estate at Peasemore, Berkshire.

References

External links
John Duffield's official website

1939 births
British financial businesspeople
People educated at Harrow School
Living people
Date of birth missing (living people)